Sangar-e Mir Abdollah (also Romanized as Sangar-e Mīr ‘Abdollāh) is a village in Bakeshluchay Rural District, in the Central District of Urmia County, West Azerbaijan Province, Iran. At the 2006 census, its population was 416, in 112 families.

References 

Populated places in Urmia County